The 2019–20 Ranji Trophy was the 86th season of the Ranji Trophy, the first-class cricket tournament that took place in India. It was contested by 38 teams, divided into four groups, with nine teams in Group A. The group stage ran from 9 December 2019 to 15 February 2020. The top five teams across Group A and Group B progressed to the quarter-finals of the competition.

Ahead of the final round of group stage matches, Gujarat and Andhra had qualified for the quarter-finals from Group A. Bengal were the third and final team from Group A to progress, after beating Punjab by 48 runs in their final match. Kerala and Hyderabad finished in the last two places across groups A and B and were relegated for the next season.

Points table

Fixtures

Round 1

Round 2

Round 3

Round 4

Round 5

Round 6

Round 7

Round 8

Round 9

References

Ranji Trophy seasons
Ranji Trophy Group A
Ranji Trophy
Ranji Trophy